Afsana is a 1951 Hindi-language drama film. It was the directorial debut of Baldev Raj Chopra and starred Ashok Kumar as twin brothers, starting a trend for such dual roles. 

It co-starred Veena, Pran, Kuldip Kaur, Jeevan, Cuckoo, and Baby Tabassum. The story was written by I. S. Johar and the music composed by Husnlal Bhagatram.

Plot summary
Ratan and Chaman (Ashok Kumar) are twin brothers who love the same girl, Meera. During a fair, all three are separated. While Chaman and Meera are found, Ratan is untraceable. Years later, Chaman is no longer attracted to Meera, but to a dancing girl named Rasily, while Meera awaits word of her childhood sweetheart Ratan, who she feels is still alive. Then the unexpected happens, Chaman gets into a fight with another man, killing him, and is on the run from the police. Misunderstandings are clarified, and the law declares this to be an accidental death, and as a result Chaman returns. But this is not the same Chaman any more. For one thing, he has lost interest in Rasily, and is more interested in Meera.

Cast
 Ashok Kumar as Ratan Kumar alias Judge Ashok Kumar / Diwan Chaman Kumar
 Veena as Meera
 Jeevan as Chatpat
 Kuldip Kaur as Leela
 Pran as Mohan
 Cuckoo as Rassily
 Tabassum as Young Meera (Baby Tabassum)
 Chaman Puri as Meera's blind dad
 Rattan Kumar as Young Ratan / Chaman
 Narbada Shankar as doctor
 O. P. Ralhan
 Jagdeep as Child in theatre play
 Uma Dutt

Music
The music was composed by Husnlal Bhagatram and the lyrics were by Asad Bhopali, Chander Oberoi, Saraswati Kumar Deepak and Gafil Harnalvi.

Soundtrack list

References

External links

1951 films
Twins in Indian films
1950s Hindi-language films
Films directed by B. R. Chopra
Films scored by Husnlal Bhagatram
Hindi-language drama films
Indian drama films
1951 drama films
Indian black-and-white films